Ragen Hatcher (born July 5, 1978) is an American politician from Gary, Indiana. A member of the Democratic Party, she serves in the Indiana House of Representatives.

Hatcher is the daughter of Richard G. Hatcher, a former mayor of Gary. She served on Gary's city council from 2007 through 2011. Hatcher ran for mayor of Gary in 2011, but lost the election. She was elected to the city council for another term in 2015. She ran for the third district in the Indiana House of Representatives in the 2018 elections to succeed Charlie Brown, and won. Hatcher briefly considered running for the Indiana Senate to succeed Eddie Melton in the 2020 elections. Melton decided to run for re-election to his Senate seat and Hatcher then decided to run for her State Rep seat.

References

External links

Living people
Politicians from Gary, Indiana
Women state legislators in Indiana
Democratic Party members of the Indiana House of Representatives
Indiana city council members
Women city councillors in Indiana
Candidates in the 2011 United States elections
21st-century American politicians
21st-century American women politicians
African-American state legislators in Indiana
African-American women in politics
1978 births